Wheeler Dam is a hydroelectric dam on the Tennessee River between Lauderdale County and Lawrence County in Alabama. It is one of nine dams on the river owned and operated by the Tennessee Valley Authority, which built the dam in the mid-1930s as part of a New Deal-era initiative to improve navigation on the river and bring flood control and economic development to the region.

Wheeler Dam is named for Civil War general and U.S. Congressman Joseph Wheeler.  Congressman Wheeler was an early advocate of federal development of the Muscle Shoals area.  The dam was listed on the National Register of Historic Places in 2016.

Location

The dam's reservoir stretches for  along the river to the base of Guntersville Dam to the east. Alabama State Route 101 (Wheeler Dam Highway) crosses the top of the dam.

Capacity

Background and construction

Along with the Tennessee River Gorge to the east, these shoals had long been an impediment to river navigation, effectively isolating the upper Tennessee Valley from the nation's major inland waterways. Canal work in the 19th century had improved navigation through the shoals, but were insufficient for major river traffic. In 1898, Congressman Joe Wheeler introduced legislation in Congress that obtained federal funding for navigation improvements. The construction of Wilson Dam in the 1920s and various other improvements helped create a  channel over the shoals, but even then navigation was only possible during times of high water flow. The Corps of Engineers had planned to build a dam at the Wheeler site in the early 1930s, and had gained authorization for the dam's lock, although the project was assumed by the Tennessee Valley Authority shortly after the Authority's creation in 1933. Construction work on Wheeler Dam began on November 21, 1933, the second major dam construction project (after Norris) attempted by TVA.

Work began as soon as possible as an unemployment relief measure, and at peak activity the project employed 4,700 workers. As TVA lacked dam construction experience, the Authority relied heavily on the Army Corps of Engineers and the U.S. Bureau of Reclamation for the dam's design. The Army Corps also designed and built the dam's locks.

Wheeler Dam was completed on November 9, 1936, constructed at a cost of $87,655,000.  Dredge work continued until the following year to extend the navigation channel to Guntersville Dam, which at the time was under construction.

See also

Dams and reservoirs of the Tennessee River
List of crossings of the Tennessee River
List of Alabama dams and reservoirs

References

External links

Wheeler Reservoir (TVA site)

Dams on the Tennessee River
Dams in Alabama
Bridges over the Tennessee River
Buildings and structures in Lauderdale County, Alabama
Buildings and structures in Lawrence County, Alabama
Tennessee Valley Authority dams
Hydroelectric power plants in Alabama
Muscle Shoals National Heritage Area
Dams completed in 1936
Energy infrastructure completed in 1936